Flamarion may refer to:

 The Great Flamarion, 1945 noir mystery film
 Flamarion's tuco-tuco, South American rodent species
 Flamarion (footballer, born 1951) (1951–2020), Flamarion Nunes Tomazolli, Brazilian football manager and former midfielder
 Flamarion (footballer, born 1996), Flamarion Jovinho Filho, Brazilian football forward

See also
Flammarion (disambiguation)